This is a list of Association football games played by the Denmark national football team between 1960 and 1969. During the 1960s, the Danish national team played 91 games, winning 40, drawing 13, and losing 38. In these games, they scored 195 goals, while conceding 160 to their opponents. The first game of the 1960s was the May 26, 1960, game against Norway, the 234th overall Danish national team game. The last game of the 1960s was the October 22, 1969, game against Hungary, the 324th game of the Danish national team.

Key
EN – European Nations Cup match
ENQ - European Nations Cup Qualifying match
F – Friendly match
NC - Nordic Football Championship match
OG - Olympic Games match
OGQ - Olympic Games Qualifying match
WCQ – World Cup Qualifying match

Games
Note that scores are written Denmark first

See also
List of Denmark national football team results
Denmark national football team statistics

Sources
Landsholdsdatabasen  at Danish Football Association
A-LANDSKAMPE - 1960 - 1969 at Haslund.info

1960
1960 in Danish football
1961 in Danish football
1962 in Danish football
1963 in Danish football
1964 in Danish football
1965 in Danish football
1966 in Danish football
1968 in Danish football
1969 in Danish football